Qifang was a Chinese peer-to-peer lending online community focused on student loans.

Qifang was founded by Calvin Chin, who became its CEO.  He is a Chinese American and a former ABC employee. With two friends, Qifang's operations were “basically doing a pure lending model focused on Chinese students wanting to go to school”.

Mr. Tingbin Tang, a serial entrepreneur, later on joined Qifang as COO and then CEO.

As a grown up from a small village in Hunan province of China, Tingbin understood how hard it is for a family to afford for their kids' tuition. So besides the lend to help model, he also introduced donate to help. For those college students who are able to pay back they can raise a P2P loan from Qifang; for those primary and/or middle school students who are not able to pay back, they can also raise a donation. Besides, Mr. Tang also introduced shop to help, game to help and ads to help business model to Qifang.

For personal reasons, Mr. Tang left Qifang at the early 2012.

In April 2013, Qifang ceased operations.

Background 
China’s higher education sector has changed from a unified, centralized and closed system to one that allows openness and diversification. As the current undergoes decentralization and semi-privatization, there is greater inequality in educational opportunities. From 1989, China started to collect tuition and accommodation fees from its students enrolled in higher education institutions. The fees have since risen from 200RMB in 1989 to 5000RMB in 2007. Based on the figures, higher education tuition fees correspond to 37% of the average gross national income per person in China. Since 1999, average tuition fees are taking up roughly 50% of per capita GDP, compared to 20% observed in other developed countries. With the potential of tuition fees to further rise, average incomes in China may not be able to catch up.

Operations 
Qifang was a P2P lending site for Chinese student loans which catered to students accepted into Chinese universities or colleges and post-graduate training programs. Qifang promoted a group lending dynamic in contrast to the conventional group borrowing associations. The company focused on helping poor students solve the problems of higher education tuition fees and full repayment and provided access to other educational financial services. Qifang’s business model shared similarities with that of Prosper Marketplace, tapping into the infant consumer lending sector of China’s developing banking infrastructure.

Under the scheme, lenders are banks, companies, non-governmental organizations, non-profit organizations, philanthropists and individuals seeking for projected investment returns in the range of 8 to 12 percent. Qifang established partnerships with schools to have access to the students’ information to verify the applications and disburse loan payments directly to the respective educational institutes. Upon application, students needed to provide personal information such as their national ID cards and had to list their school, major, grades, hometown, parents ID cards and income. Prospective lenders were recommended to invest in a portfolio of loans to reduce their risk, with the alternative of putting all their money in a single loan upon their own discretion.

References

Peer-to-peer lending companies